Manoranjan Prasad Sinha (10 Oct. 1900 - Nov. 1971) was a Bhojpuri poet, author and professor and Principal of Rajendra College, Chapra. He is famous for his Bhojpuri poem Firangia, which he wrote in 1921 during Non-cooperation movement. He was also elected as the president of 18th Bihar Hindi Sammelan at Motihari.

Life 
He was born  on 10th October 1900 in Shahabad district, his father Rajeshwar Prasad was a Judge. His family later shifted to Dumraon town of the district (presently Buxar) After completing his higher studies he became Reader at Banaras Hindu University. Later he became the Principal of Rajendra College at Chhapra. After retiring from here he became the Chancellor of Hindi Vidyapeeth in Deoghar. He spent his last years of life at an Ashram in Vrindavan. In the month of November in 1971 he died in Ranchi.

Works

Bhojpuri 

 Firangia
 Chausa Ke Maidan Me
Kitaban Me Ego Duniya Basal Ba
Kaga Bhore Bhore Bole Hamra Angana

Hindi 

 Uttarakhand Ke Path Par

References 

1900 births
1971 deaths
20th-century Indian poets
20th-century Indian educators